Ludmila Švédová (13 November 1936 – 10 February 2018) was a Czech gymnast who competed in the 1960 Summer Olympics. She was born in Šumperk.

References

1936 births
2018 deaths
Czech female artistic gymnasts
Olympic gymnasts of Czechoslovakia
Gymnasts at the 1960 Summer Olympics
Olympic silver medalists for Czechoslovakia
Olympic medalists in gymnastics
People from Šumperk
Medalists at the 1960 Summer Olympics
Sportspeople from the Olomouc Region